United States v. Scheffer, 523 U.S. 303 (1998), was the first case in which the Supreme Court issued a ruling with regard to the highly controversial matter of polygraph, or "lie-detector," testing. At issue was whether the per se exclusion of polygraph evidence offered by the accused in a military court violates the Sixth Amendment right to present a defense.

Opinion of the Court
The Court ruled that Military Rule of Evidence 707, which makes polygraph evidence inadmissible in court-martial proceedings, does not unconstitutionally abridge the right of accused members of the military to present a defense.

Significance
The United States v. Scheffer ruling came, as legal writer Joan Biskupic noted in the Washington Post, "at a time when polygraph machines are increasingly being used outside the courtroom" — and inside as well. Prosecutors were using polygraph results "to extract confessions from suspects," Biskupic observed, and defense lawyers were using "them for leverage in plea bargains"; likewise polygraph tests were being subjected to greater and greater use in the workplace.  Employers were using them to test job applicants with regard to past wrongdoing, and to monitor present jobholders as well (although this practice was mostly outlawed in 1988 by the Employee Polygraph Protection Act).  While the latter practice might raise Fourth Amendment questions of its own, the use of polygraph results in the courtroom had become a battleground for opposing factions of evidentiary experts.

See also
 List of United States Supreme Court cases, volume 523
 List of United States Supreme Court cases
 Lists of United States Supreme Court cases by volume

References

External links

United States Supreme Court cases
United States Supreme Court cases of the Rehnquist Court
1998 in United States case law
United States polygraphy law